Seb or SEB may refer to:

Given name
Seb (given name), a list of people and fictional characters, short for Sebastian
Geb, a god in Egyptian mythology also known as Seb or Keb

Arts, entertainment, and media
Super Eurobeat, or SEB, a Japanese series of music CDs

Organizations
Groupe SEB (Société d'Emboutissage de Bourgogne), a French consortium that produces small appliances
Scottish Examination Board, a former academic examination board for Scottish schools
SEB Group, a Swedish banking group
SEB bankas, a Lithuanian subsidiary
SEB Pank, an Estonian subsidiary
SEB banka, a Latvian subsidiary
Stockholms Enskilda Bank, a Swedish bank which became part of SEB Group in 1972
Society for Experimental Biology
Southern Electricity Board, a component of the British Electricity Authority
Southern European Broadcasting, a division of the American Forces Network
Special Enforcement Bureau of the Los Angeles County Sheriff's Department, Special Operations Division (the LASD's equivalent of a SWAT team)
State Electricity Board (disambiguation), India
The "Student Entertainment Board" of Washington State University

Science
Single-event induced burnout, a type of radiation damage
South Equatorial Belt, a belt of atmosphere of Jupiter
Staphylococcal Enterotoxin B

Transportation
Sabha Airport, Sabha, Libya, station code SEB
Seaburn, railway station, England, station code SEB
Son Nagar railway station, Bihar, India, station code SEB
Spiez-Erlenbach-Bahn, a railway line in Switzerland

Other uses
 Spencer Engineering Building, University of Western Ontario, Canada